Wasn't Tomorrow Wonderful? is the debut album of new wave band the Waitresses, originally released in 1982 by Polydor, licensed from ZE Records.

The album peaked at No. 41 in the Billboard 200 chart and included the earlier single "I Know What Boys Like".

Reception

AllMusic critic Ben Tausig, writing retrospectively, said that the album "was a unique and fairly important moment in early-'80s new wave", and noted that "lead singer Patty Donahue's singing ranged from a playful sexiness on the well-known hit "I Know What Boys Like" to a half-talk, half-yell with shades of post-punk groups like Gang of Four and the Raincoats on 'Pussy Strut' and 'Go On.' The guitar and bass were bizarre and funk-influenced in much the same way as other well-known Akron, OH, groups like Devo and the Pretenders".

Track listing 
The original US release contained:
"No Guilt" – 3:46
"Wise Up" – 3:20
"Quit" – 5:10
"It's My Car" – 3:20
"Wasn't Tomorrow Wonderful?" – 3:40
"I Know What Boys Like" – 3:11
"Heat Night" – 3:43
"Redland" – 2:55
"Pussy Strut" – 4:12
"Go On" – 2:49
"Jimmy Tomorrow" – 5:37
All songs written by Chris Butler.

Personnel 
Patty Donahue – vocals
Mars Williams – reeds
Tracy Wormworth – bass
David Hofstra – bass
Billy Ficca – drums
Dan Klayman – keyboards
Chris Butler – guitar
Ariel Warner – backing vocals
with:
Ralph Carney – saxophone on "No Guilt" and "I Know What Boys Like"
Don Christensen – drums on "No Guilt"
Rick Dailey – piano on "I Know What Boys Like"
Stuart Austin – drums on "I Know What Boys Like"
Andrew Fuhrmann – art direction

Charts

References 

1982 debut albums
The Waitresses albums
Polydor Records albums